4th Guards Order of Kutuzov Cavalry Corps was a prominent cavalry formation of the Soviet Red Army which served most notably as part of the Cavalry mechanized group under the command of Guards Lieutenant General Issa Pliyev in operational engagements from Operation Bagration until Battle of Prague when the Great Patriotic War finally came to an end.

Enagagements

Operation Bagration

Operation Debrecen

Battle of Prague

Commanders 
 Lieutenant General Nikolai Kirichenko (27.08.1942 - 03.11.1943)
 Lieutenant General Issa Pliyev (04.11.1943 - 05.11.1944)
 Major General Vasily Golovskoy (05.11.1944 - 08.04.1945)
 Lieutenant General Fyodor Kamkov (12.04.1945 - end of war)

References

Further reading
 От Кубани до Праги, Краснодар, 1972
 Плиев И. А., Дорогами войны, Орджоникидзе, 1973
 Казаки-гвардейцы, Краснодар, 1980
 Четвёртый гвардейский Кубанский, Краснодар, 1981
 Central Archive of the Russian Ministry of Defence (Центральный архив Министерства обороны РФ) (ЦАМО), ф. 10 гв. кд., оп. 1, д.50, л. 192
 ЦАМО, ф. 4 гв. кк.; оп. 1, д. 30, л. 2.
 ЦАМО, ф. 40 гв. кп, оп. 345798, д.1 л. 7.
 Хранилище документов новейшей истории Республики Адыгея (ХДНИ РА)ф. 1,оп. 2., д. 84, связка30, лл. 237—239.
 
 
 

Cavalry corps of the Soviet Union
Military units and formations disestablished in 1946
Cossack military units and formations